Yuttajak Glinbancheun (born 20 December 1996) is a Thai para table tennis player. He won a bronze medal at the 2016 Summer Paralympics.

References 

1996 births
Living people
Table tennis players at the 2016 Summer Paralympics
Medalists at the 2016 Summer Paralympics
Medalists at the 2020 Summer Paralympics
Yuttajak Glinbancheun
Yuttajak Glinbancheun
Yuttajak Glinbancheun
Paralympic medalists in table tennis
Yuttajak Glinbancheun
Yuttajak Glinbancheun